Flavel Park is a  public park in Portland, Oregon's Brentwood-Darlington neighborhood, in the United States. The park was acquired in 1953.

References

1953 establishments in Oregon
Brentwood-Darlington, Portland, Oregon
Protected areas established in 1953